Jana Raman (born 15 February 1991) is a Belgian basketball player for CB Claret Benimaclet and the Belgian national team.

She participated at the EuroBasket Women 2017.

References

External links
 
 Jana Raman at Eurobasket.com
 
 
 

1991 births
Living people
Belgian women's basketball players
Olympic basketball players of Belgium
Basketball players at the 2020 Summer Olympics
Belgian expatriate basketball people in Spain
Power forwards (basketball)
Sportspeople from Ghent